Daniel Hopper Emory (February 14, 1841 – February 27, 1916), better known as D. Hopper Emory, was an American politician. He served as a member of the Maryland Senate, representing Baltimore County, from 1896 to 1900.

Early life
Daniel Hopper Emory was born on February 14, 1841, in Centreville, Maryland, to Frances A. (née Wilby) and D. C. H. Emory. His father was a judge of the Baltimore County Circuit Court. The family moved to Baltimore County in 1842. Emory attended Dalrymple's Academy or Newton Academy, Rugby Institute and Mount Washington. He was tutored by Dr. Edwin Arnold. He studied law with his father. He was admitted to the bar in 1866.

Career
Emory practiced law in Baltimore County. Emory was a Republican. He was a candidate for judge in 1888. He served as commissioner of chancery of the Baltimore County Court for fifteen years. He served as a member of the Maryland Senate, representing Baltimore County, from 1896 to 1900.

Emory served as director and secretary of the board of the Female House of Refuge. He was board of governor of the Oratorio Society.

Personal life
Emory married Julia May Ridgely on November 13, 1879. He had three sons and three daughters, including Frank W., Charles Ridgely, Sara S., Julia Ridgely and Elizabeth O. His daughter Julia Ridgely was a suffragist. 

Emory was a member of St. John's Methodist Episcopal Church in Lutherville. Emory died on February 27, 1916, at his home at 17 East 22nd Street in Baltimore. He was buried at Green Mount Cemetery in Baltimore.

References

External links

Maryland State Archives: D. Hopper Emory

1841 births
1916 deaths
People from Centreville, Maryland
People from Baltimore County, Maryland
Republican Party Maryland state senators
Maryland lawyers
Members of the Methodist Episcopal Church